is the sixth single by Japanese idol group STU48, released on February 17, 2021. The title song features Chiho Ishida in her first lead performer role.

Production and release 

The single was announced on January 15, 2021 during STU48's first Nippon Budokan concert, followed by the first live performance of the title song. The song uses quadruple meter except for the chorus, during which it switches to triple meter. The music video is the first one from STU48 to heavily utilize computer graphics along with outdoor scenes filmed on Kamikamagari Island in Kure, Hiroshima, in contrast to the group's usual full location shootings at Setouchi region points of interest, due to the COVID-19 pandemic. The choreography was created by Tomohiko Tsujimoto, who has choreographed several STU48 songs and envisioned a fantasy-like atmosphere for this music video, in which the performers meet their "alternate selves".

"Hitorigoto de Kataru Kurainara" became the theme song for the 2021 animated short film , which was part of a Nippon Foundation campaign to raise awareness about marine debris. Members Marina Otani and Miyuna Kadowaki also served as voice actresses.

The B-side song  was performed by the six members who appeared on the final stages of the third AKB48 Group No. 1 Singing Ability Contest in December 2020. The Setouchi PR Unit, which members were elected using ballots included with the previous single, performed  led by top-voted member Miyuna Kadowaki. "Sunglasses Days" was performed by all full members (excluding trainees).

The single was released on February 17, 2021 in five versions: limited and regular editions of Types A and B and a Theater edition.

Reception 
"Hitorigoto de Kataru Kurainara" sold 194,000 copies in its release week according to Billboard Japan and placed second in both the Oricon Singles and Billboard Japan Hot 100 charts.

References

External links 

  

2021 singles
2021 songs
Songs with lyrics by Yasushi Akimoto
King Records (Japan) singles
Anime songs